Carolina Routier Cañigueral (born 23 April 1990 in Banyoles, Catalonia, Spain), also Caro(l) Routier, is a professional Spanish triathlete, the Spanish U23 Champion (Olympic Distance), Elite Sprint Champion, and the Spanish Aquathlon Champion (U23 and Elite) of the year 2011. Routier is also a member of the National Spanish Lifesaving Team (Selección Española de Salvamento y Socorrismo) and the 2008 European Junior Champion in lifesaving.

Carolina Routier represents the Catalan clubs CN (Club natació) Banyoles, Club Triatló Costa de Barcelona-Maresme, and Triatló Vilanova (Inverse Ditec Triatló Vilanova).
In the Circuit Català of the year 2009, she won the silver medal.

Routier studied Advertising and Public Relations at the Faculty of Tourism of the Universitat de Girona, for which she won the silver medal at the Spanish University Triathlon Championships of the year 2010. She later dropped out of the Advertising and Public Relations studies to work towards a Communications degree from the Universitat Oberta de Catalunya.

She lives in the Madrid-based Residencia Joaquín Blume (Spanish Triathlon High Performance Centre).

Carolina Routier's fiancé is the Spanish Olympian triathlete Mario Mola.

ITU Competitions 
In 2010 and 2011, Routier took part in 14 ITU events. In 2012, she won the Ibero American Championships in Chile and the Sprint African Cup in Larache.
Unless indicated otherwise the following competitions are triathlons and belong to the Elite category.
The list is based upon the official ITU rankings and the athlete's ITU Profile Page.

External links
 Catalan Triathlon Union

Notes

Living people
1990 births
Spanish female triathletes
People from Pla de l'Estany
Sportspeople from the Province of Girona
Triathletes at the 2016 Summer Olympics
Olympic triathletes of Spain